Potomida littoralis is a species of bivalve belonging to the family Unionidae.

Distribution
The species is found in Europe, Mediterranean and Southern Asia.

References

 Locard, A., 1889. - Contributions à la faune malacologique française: catalogue des espèces françaises appartenant aux genres Margaritana et Unio connues jusqu'à ce jour. Annales de la Société linnéenne de Lyon 35"1888": 111-169
 Pallary, P. (1918). Diagnoses d'une cinquantaine de mollusques terrestres nouveaux du Nord de l'Afrique. Bulletin de la Société d'Histoire Naturelle d'Afrique du Nord, 9 (7): 137-152. Alger
 Pallary, P. (1928). Notice sur seize mollusques nouveaux du Maroc découverts en 1926-1927. Journal de Conchyliologie, 72 (1): 1-24, pl. 1-4. Paris.
 Graf, D., 2011. - Types of French freshwater mussels (Mollusca, Bivalvia, Unionoidea) in Arnould Locard Collection at the Muséum national d'Histoire naturelle, Paris. Zoosystema 33(4): 451-514

External links
 Cuvier G.L. (1798). Tableau élementaire de l'Histoire Naturelle des Animaux. Paris, Baudouin. xvi + 710 pp
 Deshayes, G. P. (1845-1848). Exploration scientifique de l'Algérie. Histoire naturelle des Mollusques. Tome premier. Mollusques Acéphalés. Paris, Imprimerie Royale xx + 609 pp
  Swainson, W. (1840). A treatise on malacology or shells and shell-fish. London, Longman. viii + 419 pp.
 Lea, I. (1831). Observations on the naïades, and descriptions of new species of that and other families. Transactions of the American Philosophical Society. (NS) 4: 63-121, plates 3-18.
 Pallary, P. (1901). Sur les mollusques fossiles terrestres, fluviatiles et saumâtres de l'Algérie. Mémoires de la Société Géologique de France.
 Pallary, P. (1899). Deuxième contribution à l'étude de la faune malacologique du Nord-Ouest de l'Afrique. Supplement à "La faune malacologique du Maroc" de A. Morelet. Journal de Conchyliologie. 46 (2): 49-170, pls 5-9. Paris
 Mousson, A. (1873). Diagnosen neuer Mollusken aus West-Marokko, von Dr. von Fritsch und Dr. Rein gesammelt. Malakozoologische Blätter. 21: 149-157. Cassel.
 Michaud, A.-L.-G. (1831). Complément de l'Histoire des mollusques terrestres et fluviatiles de la France, de J.P.R. Draparnaud. i-xvi, 1-116, Errata (1 p.), 1-12, pls 14-16
 Küster, H. C. (1839-1862). Die Flussperlmuscheln (Unio et Hyria). In Abbildungen nach der Natur mit Beschreibungen. In: Systematisches Conchylien-Cabinet von Martini und Chemnitz, Bd 9(2): 1-318, pls 1-100, 18*. Published in parts
 Froufe, E.; Prié, V.; Faria, J.; Ghamizi, M.; Gonçalves, D. V.; Gürlek, M. E.; Karaouzas, I.; Kebapçi, Ü.; Şereflişan, H.; Sobral, C.; Sousa, R.; Teixeira, A.; Varandas, S.; Zogaris, S.; Lopes-Lima, M. (2016). Phylogeny, phylogeography, and evolution in the Mediterranean region: News from a freshwater mussel (Potomida, Unionida). Molecular Phylogenetics and Evolution. 100: 322-332
  Graf, D.; Cummings, K. (2019). Musselp database: The Freshwater Mussels (Unionoida) of the World (and other less consequential bivalves)
 Graf, D. L.; Cummings, K. S. (2011). Freshwater mussel (Mollusca: Bivalvia: Unionoida) richness and endemism in the ecoregions of Africa and Madagascar based on comprehensive museum sampling. Hydrobiologia. 678(1): 17-36

Unionidae